Laura Maria Calvi is an American neuroendocrinologist and physician-scientist. She is the SKAWA Foundation Professor in Endocrinology and Metabolism at the University of Rochester. Calvi researches the bone marrow microenvironment and the treatment of patients with pituitary tumors.

Education 
Calvi completed an undergraduate degree at Union College. She earned a M.D. from Harvard Medical School and conducted a residency in internal medicine followed by a fellowship in endocrinology at Massachusetts General Hospital. During her fellowship, she trained in neuroendocrinology.

Career 
Calvi joined the University of Rochester Medical Center as an assistant professor in the division of endocrinology. She runs a neuroendocrinology clinic with George Edward Vates dedicated to patients with pituitary tumors. Calvi researches the bone marrow microenvironment. In 2020, Calvi appointed as the SKAWA Foundation Professor in Endocrinology and Metabolism. She holds joint appointments in the department of pharmacology and physiology, pathology and laboratory medicine, and the cancer center.

References

External links 

 

Living people
Year of birth missing (living people)
Place of birth missing (living people)
American endocrinologists
Women endocrinologists
21st-century American women physicians
21st-century American physicians
21st-century American women scientists
American medical researchers
Women medical researchers
Cancer researchers
University of Rochester faculty
Union College (New York) alumni
Harvard Medical School alumni
Physician-scientists